"Krupa" is a 1996 song by British big beat/electronic rock band Apollo 440. The cover credits it as appearing in an advert for Sunkist.

The song is a homage to the Polish-American drummer Gene Krupa and is almost completely instrumental. The only lyrics in the entire song are "Yeah yeah" and "Now back to Gene Krupa's syncopated style" (a sample from dialogue in the film Taxi Driver), which are only repeated a couple of times. The main focus of the song is on the drumming rhythms, which were sampled from "The Ballroom Blitz" by Sweet.

The song also has its own music video, which shows various generic people on a normal day in a typical city. The video avoids showing people's faces to emphasise the focus on the music itself.

It was used in a 1998 Budweiser beer commercial.

Critical reception
A reviewer from Music Week rated the song four out of five, saying, "This rousing acidic dance anthem pays homage to legendary jazz drummer Gene Krupa and is perfect for the ebbullient mood of summer 1996." Daisy & Havoc from the magazine's RM Dance Update gave it five out of five, writing, "Having won the heads and minds of many DJs, crowds and journalists via some secretive 'Krupa' white labels, the cat is now out of its bag and owning up to being rockin' techno-gangster types Apollo 440. The 'Original' version of the track is still the knock-out secret ingredient with its amazing rock drums, raving mad enthusiasm, simple but blindingly effective driving synths and 'syncopated style'." They added that "it shows you can still make an amusing, over-the-top record without it conforming to a tired old obvious formula."

Charts

Weekly charts

Year-end charts

References

1996 songs
1996 singles
Apollo 440 songs
Songs about musicians
Songs about jazz
Sony Music UK singles